Phillip George Knightley  (23 January 1929 – 7 December 2016) was an Australian journalist, critic, and non-fiction author. He became a visiting Professor of Journalism at the University of Lincoln, England, and was a media commentator on the intelligence services and propaganda.

Biography

Born in Sydney, he began his career in 1946 as a copyboy with the Sydney Daily Telegraph. Two years as a cadet reporter with The Northern Star (Lismore) followed. He then temporarily left journalism to become a copra trader in Fiji. He next joined the Oceania Daily News (Suva), for which he wrote a social column titled Round the Town With Suzanne. The paper prided itself on being the "First Paper Published in the World Today" because of Suva's proximity to the International Dateline.

Knightley returned to Australia and worked for The Herald in Melbourne interviewing newly arrived migrants at the docks. He returned to Sydney in 1952 joining the city's Daily Mirror as a crime reporter and covered Elizabeth II's visit to Australia in 1953/54. He left for London in November 1954 as foreign correspondent for the Daily Mirror, and then went to India as managing editor of the Bombay (Mumbai) literary magazine, Imprint. He learned much later that Imprint was funded by the CIA.

Migrating to the UK in 1963, he became a special correspondent for The Sunday Times of London, remaining there until 1985. During this time, he was a member of the 'Insight' investigative team. Over a three-year period from 1968 to 1971, Knightley prepared an investigative report about the development of thalidomide in Germany and its manufacture under licence by The Distillers Company in the UK without adequate testing. He also published an investigation into the Vestey family companies, which were structured to avoid tax. This resulted in a biography of the family titled The Rise and Fall of the House of Vestey in which he wrote that the family "did not live on the income; they did not live on the interest from their investments; they lived on the interest on the interest". Knightley was also at The Sunday Times during the Hitler Diaries scandal.

After leaving The Sunday Times, he contributed literary criticism to the Mail on Sunday (London), The Independent (London), The Australians Review of Books, The Age (Melbourne), and the New York Review of Books.

He lectured on journalism, law, and war at the Australian National Press Club in Canberra, the Australian Senate, City University, London, University of Manchester, Pennsylvania State University, University of California Los Angeles, Stanford University, the Royal Military Academy Sandhurst, the Inner Temple, the International Committee of the Red Cross (ICRC), and to the University of Düsseldorf.

Knightley's main professional interests were war reporting, propaganda, and espionage. In more than 30 years of writing about espionage, he met most of the spy chiefs of all the major intelligence services in the world, and interviewed numerous officers and agents from all sides during the Cold War and since. In December 2010, he received media coverage for acting as a bail sureties provider for WikiLeaks founder Julian Assange. Having backed Assange by pledging bail in December 2010, Knightley lost the money in June 2012 when a judge ordered it to be forfeited, as Assange had sought to escape the jurisdiction of the English courts by entering the embassy of Ecuador.

In 1997, Knightley was a judge for Canada's Lionel Gelber Prize, which honours the world's best book on international relations. He was the European representative on the International Consortium of Investigative Journalists and patron of the C. W. Bean Foundation in Canberra. He was made a Member of the Order of Australia (AM) in the Queen's Birthday Honours in June 2005, for "services to journalism and as an author".

Knightley was married with two daughters, Aliya and Marisa, a son, Kim, and two granddaughters. He lived between London, Sydney and Goa in India. He died on 7 December 2016 at the age of 87.

Awards and honours
 1980, 1988 – British Press Awards Journalist of the Year – one of only two journalists to have won the honour twice
 1982 – British Colour Magazine Writer of the Year
 1983 – British Chef and Brewer Crime Writer's award – for his investigation into a murder case in Italy
 1980 – Granada Television Reporter of the Year
 1975 – Overseas Press Club of America Award for The First Casualty as the best book on foreign affairs.
 2006 – City University, London, Artes Doctor Honoris Causa (Honorary Doctor of Arts) for Services to Journalism and Authorship.
 2007 – University of Sydney, Australia, Doctor Honoris Causa (Honorary Doctor of Letters) for Services to Journalism and Authorship.

Publications
 The First Casualty: The War Correspondent as Hero, Propagandist, and Myth Maker from the Crimea to Vietnam, London, Andre Deutsch, 1975 - on war and propaganda (in the United States, a Book of the Month Club main choice), 465 pages.  
 The First Casualty: The War Correspondent As Hero and Myth-Maker from the Crimea to Kosovo. Baltimore, MD: Johns Hopkins University Press, 2002. 592 pages. 
 The First Casualty: The War Correspondent as Hero and Myth-Maker from the Crimea to Iraq. 3rd edition: 2004, 608 pages. 
 The Second Oldest Profession, 1986, on espionage (in the United States, a History Club alternative choice) 
 Philby, KGB Master Spy, his biography of Kim Philby 
 An Affair of State, about the 1963 John Profumo scandal in Britain, publication of which was banned in the United Kingdom
 The Secret Lives of Lawrence of Arabia (with Colin Simpson) 
 Philby - The Spy Who Betrayed a Generation. (with Bruce Page, David Leitch) 1968 Andre Deutsch Limited 
 The Pearl of Days, London, Hamilton, 1972, the history of the Sunday Times Suffer the Children, about the Thalidomide tragedy
 The Death of Venice, on attempts to save Venice from permanent flooding
 The Rise and Fall of the House of Vestey, on the business empire established by Sir William (later Baron) Vestey in 1897;
 A Hack's Progress, London : J. Cape, 1997, his autobiography
 Australia: A Biography of a Nation, London : Jonathan Cape, 2000. 
 Knightley, Phillip, Sarah Jackson, and Annabel Merullo; John Keegan (Introduction). The Eye of War: Words and Photographs from the Front Line''. Washington, DC: Smithsonian Books, 2003.

References

External links
 Personal website
 BBC Wars and Conflict Special Report: The Cambridge Spies by Phillip Knightley

1929 births
2016 deaths
Academics of City, University of London
Academics of the University of Lincoln
Australian expatriates in the United Kingdom
Australian historians
Australian investigative journalists
Australian political writers
Espionage writers
Historians of Australia
Writers from Sydney
Members of the Order of Australia
20th-century Australian journalists
21st-century Australian journalists
The Herald (Melbourne) people